WVNN may refer to:

WVNN (AM), a radio station (770 AM) licensed to Athens, Alabama, United States
WVNN-FM, a radio station (92.5 FM) licensed to Trinity, Alabama, United States